Our Crime is a British documentary series shown on BBC Three about youth crime.

Episode 1: Robbed 
Air date – 2 April 2012

Teenage robbing sprees.

Episode 2: Riot 
Air date – 9 April 2012

The August 2011 riots.

Episode 3: Speed 
Air date – 16 April 2012

Car crime being recorded and uploaded online.

Episode 4: Attacked 
Air date – 23 April 2012

Camera phones, CCTV and social networking's role in crime.

External links

2012 British television series debuts
BBC television documentaries
British crime television series